Karagüney is a village in the Pertek District, Tunceli Province, Turkey. The village is populated by Kurds and had a population of 105 in 2021.

The hamlets of Kalender, Karameşe, Sarıpınar and Şamlı are attached to the village.

References 

Kurdish settlements in Tunceli Province
Villages in Pertek District